Jamba may refer to:

Places
Jamba, Cuando Cubango, Angola, former base of rebel group UNITA
Jamba, Huíla, Angola
Jamba, in Bap tehsil, Jodhpur District, Rajasthan, India

People
Almerindo Jaka Jamba, an Angolan politician
João Pereira Jamba, an Angolan football defender

Other uses
 Japan Australia Migratory Bird Agreement
 Jamba!, a ringtone vendor owned by VeriSign (known as "Jamster!" in some countries)
 Jamba Juice, a company producing blended fruit and vegetable juices, smoothies and similar products
 "Jamba", a song by Tyler, the Creator from the album Wolf

See also 
 Jambalaya, a mainly Creole dish
 Jambo (disambiguation)
 Jambi (disambiguation)
 Jambu (disambiguation)